The  or Shield Society was a private militia in Japan dedicated to traditional Japanese values and veneration of the Emperor. It was founded and led by author Yukio Mishima.

Background 
The Tatenokai was created on October 5, 1968, recruiting its membership primarily from the staff of Ronsō Journal, an obscure right-wing college newspaper. The private army was formed due to Mishima's alarm over the scale of left-wing protests in Tokyo and his recruitment advertisement were placed in right-wing newspapers. There were around 100 original members, who were mostly students of Waseda University. Along with outdoor activities, the members, who joined voluntarily, were subjected to rigorous physical training that included kendo and long-distance running. In an unusual move, the Tatenokai was granted the right to train with the nation's armed forces, the Japan Self-Defense Forces. An account attributed this shift in Tatenokai's orientation when Mishima began associating himself with this military organization as well as his introduction to Yasuhiro Nakasone, a member of the Japanese Diet who would become the Defense Agency chief and Prime Minister.

1970 coup attempt

On November 25, 1970 Mishima and four Tatenokai members briefly seized control of the Self-Defense Force's headquarters and attempted to rally the soldiers to stage a coup d'état and restore imperial rule. When this failed, Mishima and Masakatsu Morita, the Tatenokai's main student leader, committed seppuku (ritual suicide). The rest of the members, around 90 people, were not informed about Mishima's plan at all.

Participants
Yukio Mishima, leader
Hiroyasu Koga, Kanagawa University
Masayoshi Koga, Kanagawa University
Masakatsu Morita, Waseda University
Masahiro Ogawa, Meiji Gakuin University

Inspired events
On 3 March 1977, four Japanese nationalists took 12 hostages at the Keidanren Kaikan (headquarters and hall of Japan Federation of Economic Organizations), spreading leaflets at the scene that denounced big business. The hostages were released, unharmed, after an eleven-hour standoff during which the hostage-takers spoke for more than three hours to Mishima's widow, Yoko. Two of the hostage-takers – Yoshio Ito and Shunichi Nishio – were believed to have been former members of the Tatenokai.

References 

Political organizations based in Japan
Organizations established in 1968
Far-right politics in Japan
Japanese nationalism
Monarchism in Japan
Anti-communism in Japan
Militias in Asia
Yukio Mishima